Diffractaic acid is a β-orcinol depside with the molecular formula C20H22O7, which is produced by lichens. Diffractaic acid has cytotoxic, cytogenetic, oxidative, analgesic and antiviral effects.

The foliose lichen species Punctelia diffractaica is named for the presence of this compound.

References

Further reading 

 

Polyphenols
Lichen products
Methoxy compounds
Alkylresorcinols
Dihydroxybenzoic acids
Esters